Mohamed Ramadan (born 23 May 1988) is an Egyptian actor, singer, rapper, dancer and producer.

Career

Acting
Mohamed Ramadan began acting during school. He has received the award for greatest nationwide talent three times consecutively – an unprecedented achievement. He started his career with small roles in TV series like The Cindrella, until he had his big break in Yousry Nasrallah's Ehky Ya Sharazad (Tell me, Shahrazad). He then went on to star in films produced by the Egyptian producers Mohamed and Ahmed El Sobky, which made him one of the most valuable actors in the Middle East. Mohamed Ramadan is perhaps the only Egyptian actor to have been praised by the performer Omar Sharif, who stated that he had chosen Mohamed to perpetuate his acting legacy.

Music
Ramadan collaborated with French singer and rapper Gims in the song "Ya Habibi". In 2020, his Youtube channel was one of the most-viewed in the Middle East.

Other ventures
Mohamed Ramadan has been also very successful in commercial sponsorships and advertising promotions in Egypt and the Arab World including the telecommunication company Etisalat Misr and 4G with associated music releases like "ElTop". The promotions are under the slogan "Aqwa Cart fi Masr" (meaning "the strongest card in Egypt").

Controversy
In October 2019, Ramadan posted a video of himself in a co-pilot's seat during a private flight run by Smart Aviation Company to Saudi Arabia, which led to a life-time ban on the pilot, Ashraf Abu Al-Yusr, due to violations against the Egyptian civil aviation law. In June 2021, the Egyptian Public Prosecution froze all bank accounts of Ramadan, as he had to pay £E6m in compensation to the family of the pilot Abu Al-Yusr, who had died earlier that year.

On November 21, 2020, the Israeli Ministry of Foreign Affairs shared a photo of Ramadan with Arab-Israeli footballer Dia Saba and Israeli singer Omer Adam in a rooftop party in Dubai. which sparked condemnation by Arabs on social media accusing Ramadan of being a Zionist. The incident came months after Israel signed normalization deals with the United Arab Emirates and Bahrain. Egyptian–Israeli relations have remained chilled since signing the peace treaty in 1979. The Union of Artistic Syndicates suspended his membership for the same reason. A soap opera featuring Ramadan was also reportedly cancelled. By mid-December that year, he was exempt from any suspension or penalties related to the issue.

In August 2022, Ramadan received backlash after he posted a photo of him with his arm around an Israeli fan on his TikTok account. The photo was widely shared on social media and became the subject of articles in Egyptian newspapers including Al-Masry Al-Youm. The photo was described as "a stamp of approval for normalization with Israel". Ramadan did not address the condemnations.

Personal life
Ramadan has married twice. He has a daughter named Haneen from his first marriage. Then he married Nesreen El Sayed Abd El Fattah, with whom he has two children: Ali and Kenz.

Discography

Singles
(Selective. Arabic title in parenthesis)
2018: "Number One" (نمبر وان)
2018: "El Malek" (الملك)
2018: "Hatwla3" (هتولع) (soundtrack of film Diesel)
2018: Geshna Sa3b (جيشنا صعب)
2019: "Mafia" (مافيا)
2019: "The Moon" (القمر)
2019: "Virus" (ڤايرس)
2019: "Baba" (بابا)
2019: "Africa" (أفريقيا)
2019: "Ensay" (with Saad Lamjarred) (إنساي)
2019: "Al Sultan" (السلطان)
2019: "Money" (ماني)
2020: "Bum Bum" (رايحين نسهر)
2020: "Sting" (ستينج)
2020: "Enta Gad3" (إنت جدع)
2020: "Omy Maleka" (أمي ملكة)
2020: "Corona Virus" (كورونا ڤيروس)
2020: "Tik Tok" (with Super Sako) (تيك توك)
2020: "Ya Habibi" (with Gims) (يا حبيبي) 
2021: "Aladdin Lamp" (مصباح علاء الدين)
2021: "Yalla Beena" (يلا بينا)
2021: "Ana el Batal" (أنا البطل) 
2021: "Versace Baby"
2021: "Champion" (المكسب بتاعنا - شامبيون) (feat. Frankie J)
2021: "Thabt" (ثابت)
2022: "Bye Bye Thanaweya" (باي باي ثانوية)

Filmography

Films
 Awlad Al-Shareware (2006)
 Ramy Al-Etsamy (2007)
 Ehky ya Chahrazade (2009)
 El Almany (2011)
 Abdo Mota (2012)
 Sa'a We Nos (2012)
 Hassal Kher (2012)
 Qalb El-Assad (2013)
 Wahed Sa'idy (2014)
 Shadd Agzaa (2015)
 El-Kenz (The Treasure 1) (2017)
 Jawab Ieteqal (2017)
 Akher Deek Fe Masr (2017)
 Hassan Allam shabah (2018)
 el-Diesel (2018)
 El-Kenz 2 (The Treasure - 2) (2019)
 Sery lel 8aya (2020)

Television series 

 El-Sharika (2012)
 Ibn Halal (2014)
 Al Ostoura (2016)
 Nesr el-Saeed (2018)
 Zelzal (2019)
 Al Prince (2020)
 Mousa (2021)

References

External links 
 

1988 births
Living people
People from Qena
Egyptian male film actors
Egyptian rappers 
Egyptian male dancers 
Egyptian producers 
21st-century Egyptian male singers
Egyptian male television actors